The 2019 World Taekwondo Grand Slam is the 3rd edition of the World Taekwondo Grand Slam series taking place from 18-20 December in Wuxi, China.

Qualifications and seeding position 

 In case of one athlete occupying multiple seeding positions, the highest seeding position shall be assigned to the athlete, and vacant seeding positions shall be filled by other seeding athletes only
 The highest Olympic ranking athletes of November, 2019 shall fill up the unoccupied position, but not for seeding.

Non Seeded Athletes are as follows:

 2nd place of 2019 Qualification Tournament II
 2nd place of 2019 Qualification Tournament I
 3rd place of 2019 Qualification Tournament II
 3rd place of 2019 Qualification Tournament I
 Recommended athlete by WT Technical Committee
 Recommended athlete by Host Country.

Events schedule 
The competition was held from 18 December to 20 December.

Medal summary

Men

Women

Medal table

References 

World Taekwondo Grand Slam
Grand Slam
World Taekwondo Grand Slam
International sports competitions hosted by China
Sport in Wuxi
World Taekwondo Grand Slam